Carts is a 2007 film directed by Chris Cashman. It premiered at The Valley Film Festival where it won the "10 Degrees Hotter" Award for Best Feature Film.

Plot 
A group of misfit shopping cart attendants deal with another day at their dead end jobs.

Cast
 Douglas Spain as Roberto
 Ted Lange as Ted
 Fernanda Romero as Maria
 Bradford Anderson as Ed
 Pete Gardner as Daniel McCarey
 Marshall Manesh as Fab
 Martin Klebba as Joe
 Mo Collins as Hilda
 Warren Stevens as Fred Tait
 Dennis Hayden as Ted
 Aaron Smolinski as Seth
 Paul H. Kim as Mike
 Sam Sarpong as Conrad
 Douglas Tait as Hubertus
 Isabel Cueva as Lupe
 Angelina Spicer as Angie
 Herman Poppe as Henry Low

Production 
Writer/director Cashman and his wife financed Carts on their credit cards. It was filmed on a JVC GY-HD100U Pro HD camcorder. It was filmed in a Costco parking lot in Burbank, California over 15 days.

Reception 
Film Threat scored it 3.5/5, calling it "a good start" for director Cashman.

References

External links 
 

2007 films
2007 comedy-drama films